Science Museum station (Cantonese Jyutping: Fo1 Hok6 Gun2 Zaam6), formerly Kexueguan station is a station of Line 1 and Line 6 of the Shenzhen Metro. Line 1 platforms opened on 28 December 2004 and Line 6 platforms opened on 18 August 2020. It is located underground at the junction of Shennan Zhonglu, Shangbu Lu and Congling Lu, in Futian District, Shenzhen, China. It takes its name from the Shenzhen Science Museum. It is near CITIC City Plaza.

Station layout

Exits

References

Railway stations in Guangdong
Shenzhen Metro stations
Futian District
Railway stations in China opened in 2004
Railway stations located underground in China